Jeffry Shearer Rense is an American radio talk-show host. His show, the Jeff Rense Program, was broadcast via satellite radio and is now released through his personal website.

Rense's radio program and website propagate conspiracy theories, including those of 9/11 conspiracists, ufologists and advocates of the paranormal, the creation of diseases, chemtrails, evidence of advanced ancient technology, emergent energy technologies, and alternative medicine.

Rense's writings and website have been deemed pro-Nazi and antisemitic by the Anti-Defamation League and the Southern Poverty Law Center.

Radio host
Rense's first on-air experience came while he was a student at University of California, Santa Barbara in the 1970s."IVCC HOLDS ELECTION, POLL", The Daily Nexus, University of California, Santa Barbara, issue April 13, 1971. 

In 1994, Rense self-financed a radio show on Santa Barbara's KTMS. The show was originally broadcast as Sightings on the Radio, the title being a direct reference to the television series Sightings. The show was originally distributed by Premiere Radio Networks but was dropped in the late 1990s after it was deemed hate speech and banned in Europe. Talk Radio Network then carried the show through the early 2000s, when all references to Sightings were dropped and the title Jeff Rense Program was adopted.

Genesis Communications Network took over distribution and carried the show through August 2009, when Rense accused fellow GCN host Alex Jones of threatening to "destroy" him. Jeff Rense Program is now streamed through Rense's personal website.

Guests on the show have included former Congresswoman Cynthia McKinney; host of The Political Cesspool, James Edwards; Brad Steiger; British conspiracy theorist David Icke; Texe Marrs; and David Duke.

Criticism of anti-Semitic content
The Anti-Defamation League and the Southern Poverty Law Center have stated that Rense disseminates antisemitic and pro-Nazi speech while promoting people with similar ideologies.

Notes

References
 Silva, Veronica C. "Cyberspace: Host to Host". BusinessWorld (Philippines). 4 September 1997. p. 18.

External links
Jeff Rense Program – official site

Living people
Year of birth missing (living people)
9/11 conspiracy theorists
American conspiracy theorists
American talk radio hosts
Anti-Zionism in the United States
John F. Kennedy conspiracy theorists
American critics of Islam
Critics of Judaism
Radio personalities from St. Louis
University of California, Santa Barbara alumni
UFO conspiracy theorists
American neo-Nazis